Kristina Škuleta-Gromova (born 15 September 2000) is an Estonian figure skater. She has won six senior international medals and represented Estonia at five ISU Championships. She is a four-time Estonian national medalist.

Career

Early years 
Škuleta-Gromova began learning to skate in 2005. She debuted on the ISU Junior Grand Prix series in September 2014 and competed at four consecutive World Junior Championships, beginning with the 2015 event in Tallinn, where she placed 34th.

The following season, she finished 29th at the 2016 World Junior Championships in Debrecen, Hungary.

2016–17 season 
Škuleta-Gromova made her senior international debut in October 2016 at the Golden Bear of Zagreb. She won two senior medals – gold at the Jegvirag Cup in Hungary and bronze at the Egna Trophy in Italy. She also appeared as a junior, placing 28th at the 2017 World Junior Championships in Taipei, Taiwan.

2017–18 season 
Škuleta-Gromova represented Estonia at two ISU Championships – the 2018 European Championships in Moscow, Russia, and the 2018 World Junior Championships in Sofia, Bulgaria.

Programs

Competitive highlights 
CS: Challenger Series; JGP: Junior Grand Prix

Notes

References

External links 
 

2000 births
Estonian female single skaters
Living people
Sportspeople from Tallinn